Henry River may refer to:

Henry River (New South Wales), Australia, tributary of Mann River
Henry River (Western Australia), Australia, tributary of Ashburton River
Henry River (New Zealand), New Zealand, tributary of Waiau River

See also 
 Henry (disambiguation)
 Henry River Mill Village, North Carolina, U.S.